Senator Wolff may refer to:

George W. Wolff (1848–1919), Wisconsin State Senate
Joseph C. Wolff (1849–1896), New York State Senate
Nelson Wolff (born 1940), Texas State Senate

See also
Senator Wolf (disambiguation)